Shawn Myers (born 26 May 1969) is a Trinidadian-American-British former professional basketball player. After playing college basketball between 1987 and 1991, Myers had an extensive professional career playing in Europe while also having stints in Australia and New Zealand.

Between 1997 and 2001, Myers played in Lithuania, Finland and Iceland before moving to Britain where he began a long-term career in the British Basketball League (BBL). Between 2001 and 2013, he appeared in every BBL season for various teams including the Chester Jets and the Cheshire Jets. After beginning the 2013–14 season with the Cheshire Phoenix, he parted ways with the club by mutual consent on 31 October and subsequently retired from basketball at the age of 44.

In addition to his lucrative European career, Myers played nine games in the New Zealand National Basketball League in 2002 for the Harbour Heat (one game) and the Hawke's Bay Hawks (eight games), and spent three seasons with the Geelong Supercats of the SEABL between 2006 and 2008, playing in 73 games and winning a national title in 2006.

References

External links
Eurobasket.com profile
Face to Face: Shawn Myers
BBL player profile

1969 births
Living people
Cheshire Jets players
Forwards (basketball)
Leicester Riders players
London Lions (basketball) players
Newcastle Eagles players
Tampereen Pyrintö players
Ungmennafélagið Tindastóll men's basketball players
Úrvalsdeild karla (basketball) players